Ornithinimicrobium flavum is a Gram-positive, non-spore-forming and non-motile bacterium species from the genus Ornithinimicrobium which has been isolated from a leaf of the plant Paris polyphylla var. yunnanensis.

References 

Actinomycetia
Bacteria described in 2017